The Molière radius is a characteristic constant of a material giving the scale of the transverse dimension of the fully contained electromagnetic showers initiated by an incident high energy electron or photon. By definition, it is the radius of a cylinder containing on average 90% of the shower's energy deposition. Two Molière radii contain 95% of the shower's energy deposition. It is related to the radiation length  by the approximate relation , where  is the atomic number. The Molière radius is useful in experimental particle physics in the design of calorimeters: a smaller Molière radius means better shower position resolution, and better shower separation due to a smaller degree of shower overlaps.

The Molière radius is named after German physicist Paul Friederich Gaspard Gert Molière (1909–64).

Molière radii for typical materials used in calorimetry
 LYSO crystals: 2.07 cm
 Lead tungstate crystals: 2.2 cm
 Caesium iodide: 3.5 cm
 Liquid krypton: 4.7 cm
 Liquid argon: 9.04 cm
 Earth's atmosphere at sea level: 79 m
 Earth's atmosphere above ground: 91 m

References 

Experimental particle physics